is a railway station in the city of Toyota, Aichi, Japan, operated by Meitetsu.

Lines
Uwa Goromo Station is served by the Meitetsu Mikawa Line and is 13.9 kilometers from the terminus of the line at Chiryū Station.

Station layout
The station  has a single island platform connected to the station building by a level crossing. The station has automated ticket machines, Manaca automated turnstiles and is unattended.

Platforms

Adjacent stations

|-
!colspan=5|Nagoya Railroad

Station history
Uwa Goromo Station was opened on August 31, 1920, as a station on the privately owned Mikawa Railway. On December 18, 1929, the Okazaki Line began operations to the station. The Mikawa Railway was merged with Meitetsu on June 1, 1941. Operations of the Okazaki Line (renamed the Koromo Line) were discontinued on March 4, 1973. The station has been unattended since June 16, 2001.

Passenger statistics
In fiscal 2017, the station was used by an average of 4438 passengers daily (boarding passengers only).

Surrounding area
 Sumitomo Rubber, Toyota factory
 Dojiyama Elementary School
 Japan National Route 155

See also
 List of Railway Stations in Japan

References

External links

 Official web page 

Railway stations in Japan opened in 1920
Railway stations in Aichi Prefecture
Stations of Nagoya Railroad
Toyota, Aichi